Mina is an album by Italian singer Mina released in 1971.

The album is one of the singer's most successful, yielding the hit singles "Amor Mio" and "Grande grande grande" and outselling every other album release in 1972.

Track listing

Credits
Mina – vocals
Pino Presti – arranger/conductor in "E penso a te" and "Grande grande grande"
Augusto Martelli – arranger/conductor in "Le farfalle della notte" and "Sentimentale"
Gian Piero Reverberi – arranger/conductor in "Capirò (I'll Be Home)", "Amor mio" and "Mi fai sentire cosi strana"
Mario Robbiani – arranger/conductor in "Non ho parlato mai", "Alfie", "Al cuore non comandi mai (Plus fort que nous)", "Something" and "Vacanze"
Nuccio Rinaldis – sound engineer

References

Mina (Italian singer) albums
1971 albums
Albums conducted by Pino Presti
Albums arranged by Pino Presti
Italian-language albums